Waking Hour can refer to the following:

Waking Hour, Vienna Teng's first album
Waking Hour, a progressive metal band based in Seattle, Washington
Waking Hours, Del Amitri's second album
The Waking Hour, the only album by the band Dali's Car
"Waking Hour" A song by the Dutch band The Gathering